Lewis Thompson (born 10 October 1999) is a Northern Irish professional footballer who plays as a defender for Ashton United on loan from Spennymoor Town.

Club career
Thompson began his career with Manchester United, moving to Blackburn Rovers in 2016. Whilst with Blackburn he spent loan spells at F.C. United of Manchester in 2018, and AFC Fylde in 2020. He moved to Scunthorpe United in July 2021, signing a one-year contract, having failed to make a competitive appearance for Blackburn.

He was released by Scunthorpe at the end of the 2021–22 season.

On 25 November 2022, Thompson signed for National League North side Spennymoor Town. In March 2023, he joined Northern Premier League Premier Division club Ashton United on loan until the end of the season.

International career
He has represented Northern Ireland at under-21 level.

References

1999 births
Living people
Association footballers from Northern Ireland
Northern Ireland under-21 international footballers
Manchester United F.C. players
Blackburn Rovers F.C. players
F.C. United of Manchester players
AFC Fylde players
Scunthorpe United F.C. players
Spennymoor Town F.C. players
Ashton United F.C. players
English Football League players
National League (English football) players
Association football defenders